Scenes from a Movie is an American band from Charleston, West Virginia.

History
Scenes from a Movie members Tony Bush and Jon Ewing were friends in high school. Ewing went on to the University of Charleston while Bush went to college at Bowling Green State University. Ewing, and the guitarist Luke Del Papa, convinced Bush to leave university and the group expanded to a quintet, choosing the name Scenes from a Movie. Adding Jared Miller on drums and Adam Triplett on bass guitar, the group started touring, soon appearing with groups such as The Starting Line, Thursday and Boys Like Girls. They signed to an East West Records subsidiary, One Big Spark, in 2006, and continued touring, playing at Warped Tour 2007 and then opening for Permanent ME and The Junior Varsity. Their first LP, The Pulse, was released on July 24, 2007, and was compared to Fall Out Boy and Panic! at the Disco. They were named Spin magazine's Band of the Day on September 14, 2007.

On October 2, 2007, Bush and Triplett announced their departure from the band which later split up.

Members
Tony Bush - vocals
Jon Ewing - guitar
Luke Del Papa - guitar
Adam Triplett - bass guitar
Jared Miller - drums
Logan Mace - vocals (filled in after Bush left the band in 2007)
Aaron "Squared" Edwards - bass guitar (filled in after Triplett left the band in 2007)
Greg McGowan - bass guitar (played for a while in 2005-2006 before Triplett joined the band)

Discography
Take Hands, Take Hearts, Take Aim (EP, 2005)
 Crash and Learn
 You Make This an Art
 Speaking Of
 Set Fire
 Beautiful

The Pulse (One Big Spark/EastWest Records, 2007)
 Just Ask Us
 Save You
 Irukandji
 Heartbeat From Hell
 If I Die
 Hang Your Halo
 Detective, Detective
 The Cover Up
 If It’s My Game I Can’t Lose
 Heads Or Tails
 Goodbye Reckless

References

External links
Official website
Official MySpace
Official PureVolume

Musical groups from West Virginia
American pop punk groups
Musicians from Charleston, West Virginia